Theobald Butler Barrett (July 24, 1894 – March 26, 1969) was a Canadian politician. He was elected to the House of Commons of Canada in 1945 as a Member of the Progressive Conservative Party of Canada to represent the riding of Norfolk. He was defeated in the 1949 election. Prior to his federal political experience, he was a Lieutenant in the Royal Canadian Artillery between 1942 and 1943.

Barrett was the grandfather of Toby Barrett, Member of the Ontario Provincial Parliament for Haldimand—Norfolk from 1995 to 2022.

External links
 

1894 births
1969 deaths
Members of the House of Commons of Canada from Ontario
Progressive Conservative Party of Canada MPs